For Every Man is the third contemporary Christian music album by Steve Camp. It was released by Myrrh Records in 1981. This album introduced what would become one of Camp's best known songs, "Run to the Battle".

Track listing 
"Jesus on Our Side" (Steve Camp, Russ Hollingsworth) - 3:25
"Gimme What it Takes" (Keith Thomas) - 3:29
"Farther and Higher" (Thomas) - 3:16
"Jesus Drawing Me" (Camp) - 4:12
"The Net of Peter" (Camp) - 4:10
"Thank You" (Camp, Howard McCrary) - 3:25
"The Only Story (Written in My Life)" (McCrary, Thomas) - 2:36
"You Just Talk to Me" (Camp, Carol Frazier, Rob Frazier, Hank Neuberger) - 3:40
"Run to the Battle" (Camp) - 3:46
"Back in the Furnace" (Camp) - 4:48
"For Every Man" (Camp) - 1:20

Note: Never released on CD

Personnel 

 Steve Camp – lead vocals, backing vocals (6, 7, 8), acoustic guitar (8, 9), acoustic piano (11)
 Keith Thomas – Fender Rhodes (1, 4, 8), acoustic piano (1, 2, 3, 5, 7, 9, 10), backing vocals (1, 2, 3, 6, 7)
 Howard McCrary – Wurlitzer organ (2, 5), Fender Rhodes (3, 7, 10), acoustic piano (6), backing vocals (6, 7), synthesizers (7), organ (9)
 Randy Hammel – synthesizers (5)
 Jon Goin – guitar (1-7, 10), 12-string guitar (8), acoustic guitar (9), electric guitar (9)
 Sonny Garrish – steel guitar (8) 
 Bob Wray – bass (1)
 Larry Paxton – bass (2, 8, 10)
 Steve Dokken – bass (3, 5, 6, 7, 9)
 Mark Hammond – drums (1, 2, 5, 6, 8, 10)
 Kenny Malone – drums (7, 9)
 Terry McMillan – percussion (1-7, 9)
 Denis Solee – flute (4)
 Paul Libman – horn arrangements (2, 6)
 Bergen White – string arrangements (3)
 Don Hart – string arrangements (4, 10)
 Diana DeWitt – backing vocals (1, 2, 3)
 Gary Pigg – backing vocals (1, 2)
 Donna Cooper – backing vocals (3)
 Russ Taff – backing vocals (6)
 Joan Anderson – backing vocals (9, 11)
 Diane Thiel – backing vocals (9, 11)
 Kevin Thiel – backing vocals (9, 11)

Production

 Keith Thomas – producer
 Neal Joseph – executive producer
 Hank Neuberger – co-producer, engineer
 Richard Achor – additional engineer
 John Bolt – additional engineer
 Ben Harris – additional engineer
 Randy Holland – additional engineer
 Chicago Recording Company, Chicago, Illinois – remixing location
 Hank Williams – mastering at Woodland Mastering, Nashville, Tennessee
 Dennis Hill – inner sleeve design
 Jim Osborne – design, layout
 Alan Messer – photography

References 

Steve Camp albums
1981 albums
Myrrh Records albums